Jharkhand Raksha Shakti University (JRSU) is a state university located at Ranchi, Jharkhand, India. It was established by the Government of Jharkhand through the Jharkhand Raksha Shakti University Act, 2016. It offers courses in the fields of police science and security management.

History
The foundation stone for the university was laid by the Minister of Defence Manohar Parrikar on 23 January 2016. The university opened on 4 October 2016 with 179 students on five courses.

See also
List of state universities in India
List of institutions of higher education in Jharkhand

References

External links
 

State universities in Jharkhand
Educational institutions established in 2016
2016 establishments in Jharkhand
Universities and colleges in Ranchi